Aksaysky District, or Aksay Region is an administrative and municipal district (raion), one of the forty-three in Rostov Oblast, Russia. It is located in the western central part of the oblast. Its administrative center is the town of Aksay. Population: 102,369 (2010 Census);  The population of Aksay accounts for 41.0% of the district's total population.

Economy

Transportation
Platov International Airport, which will serve Rostov-on-Don, located at the stanitsa of Grushevskaya, which has commenced all services on 7 December 2017.

References

Notes

Sources

Districts of Rostov Oblast